"Shadrack" (aka "Shadrach" or "Shadrach, Meshach and Abednego") is a popular song written by Robert MacGimsey in the 1930s and performed by Louis Armstrong and others.

Background
The lyrics refer to the biblical account of Shadrach, Meshach, and Abednego and the fiery furnace.

Brook Benton version
In 1962 the song was a hit single for Brook Benton, peaking at #19 in Billboard's Hot 100 chart during the week of February 17, 1962.

Chart performance

Other cover versions
The song is featured on pop, soul, Gospel and jazz recordings by others, among them:
 
The Ames Brothers
The Golden Gate Quartet
The Fairfield Four
The Larks
Benny Goodman 
Grant Green
Bill Holman
Sonny Rollins
Bobby Scott
Phil Harris
Kay Starr
Louis Prima, 
Sister Rosetta Tharpe

Popular culture
In the 1951 film The Strip, the song is performed by a band featuring Louis Armstrong and Jack Teagarden, among others.

References

1962 singles
Benny Goodman songs
Shadrach, Meshach, and Abednego
Year of song missing
Songs written by Robert MacGimsey
1930s songs